Le Jour is French for "The Day". The term may refer to:

Newspapers
Le Jour, a Quebec newspaper in favour of Quebec independence that existed from 1974 to 1976.
Le Jour (Côte d'Ivoire), a newspaper circularized in Côte d'Ivoire. 
Le Jour (France), a French newspaper opposed to the 1930s Popular Front.
Le Jour (watch), a watch manufacturing company.
Le Jour (1937-1947), a Quebec anti-nationalist newspaper that existed from 1937 to 1947.
Le Jour, Lebanese newspaper founded in 1933 that was merged in 1971 with L'Orient to form the L'Orient-Le Jour.

Entertainment
 Le Jour Des Fourmis (Day of the Ants), 1992 French science-fiction novel
 "Le Jour Viendra", 1992 song by Algerian singer Khaled, on the Sahra album
 Le Jour se lève (Daybreak), 1939 French film